Guy Baker was the head coach for the United States women's national water polo team competed in the 2008 Beijing Olympic games. He is now the Director Of Olympic Development of USA Water Polo. Baker had guided the team to a silver medal in the 2000 Summer Olympics, a bronze medal in the 2004 Summer Olympics, and a silver medal in the 2008 Summer Olympics (only players receive a medal at the Olympics), becoming one of the most successful water polo coach in Olympic history. In 2018, he was inducted into the USA Water Polo Hall of Fame.

Career
Prior to becoming the head coach for the national team, he was the water polo coach at UCLA and California State University, Long Beach, beginning in 1985. At Cal-State Long Beach, Baker was a star player.

UCLA
Baker coached both the men's and women's water polo teams to national championships. The men's team won the NCAA championship in 1995, 1996, 1999 and 2000, while the women's team won the national collegiate championship in 1996, 1997 and 1998. Both of his teams won a national title in the same school year twice (1995–96 and 1996–97), a first for a coach. In his first year at UCLA, he was named American Water Polo Coaches Association Coach of the Year for leading the men's water polo team to a second-place finish in the NCAA tournament.

Baker was inducted into the UCLA Athletics Hall of Fame on October 11, 2014.

Olympics
At the 2008 China Summer Olympic games, his American team lost 8-9 in the championship game to the Netherlands, and the team took home the silver medal.  "Head Coach Guy Baker has presided over one of the most dominating runs for women’s water polo the last eight years plus and with 10 first time Olympians on the roster the future looks very bright for this group," according to USA Water Polo.

See also
 United States women's Olympic water polo team records and statistics
 List of world champions in women's water polo

References

External links
 

Year of birth missing (living people)
Living people
People from Los Angeles County, California
American male water polo players
Olympic silver medalists for the United States in water polo
Olympic bronze medalists for the United States in water polo
Long Beach State Beach men's water polo players
Long Beach State Beach men's water polo coaches
UCLA Bruins men's water polo coaches
American water polo coaches
United States men's national water polo team coaches
United States women's national water polo team coaches
Water polo coaches at the 2000 Summer Olympics
Water polo coaches at the 2004 Summer Olympics
Water polo coaches at the 2008 Summer Olympics